Bambo Diaby Diaby (born 17 December 1997) is a Senegalese footballer who plays as a defender for  club Preston North End.

Club career

Early career
Diaby was born in Senegal, but moved to Mataró, Catalonia at the age of four and went on to represent clubs of the region as a youth. He made his first team debut for UE Cornellà on 15 May 2016, coming on as a substitute in a 0–1 Segunda División B home loss against CF Reus Deportiu.

In September 2016, Diaby joined Serie A club U.C. Sampdoria, returning to the youth setup. The following 1 February, he was loaned to Serie C side Mantova F.C. until June.

On 28 July 2017, Diaby agreed to a one-year loan deal with Girona FC, being immediately assigned to the reserves in the third division. He made his first team debut on 28 November, replacing Carles Planas in a 1–1 away draw against Levante UD, for the season's Copa del Rey.

Lokeren
On 21 June 2018, Diaby agreed to a three-year contract with Belgian First Division A side KSC Lokeren.

Barnsley
On 5 July 2019, Diaby signed for Barnsley on a four-year contract. On 21 January 2020, it was revealed that Diaby had failed a drugs test after a game against Blackburn Rovers on 23 November 2019. On 6 October 2020 Diaby was handed a two-year ban by the FA for testing positive for the banned substance higenamine and his contract with Barnsley was subsequently terminated.

Preston North End
On 31 January 2022, Diaby joined EFL Championship club Preston North End on a short-term deal until the end of the 2021–22 season. The club entered discussions surrounding a new contract at the end of the season and on May 30 announced he had signed a new two-year deal.

Career statistics

References

External links

1997 births
Living people
Senegalese footballers
Association football defenders
Segunda División B players
Belgian Pro League players
English Football League players
UE Cornellà players
CF Peralada players
Girona FC players
Serie C players
U.C. Sampdoria players
Mantova 1911 players
UE Vilassar de Mar players
K.S.C. Lokeren Oost-Vlaanderen players
Barnsley F.C. players
Preston North End F.C. players
Senegalese expatriate footballers
Senegalese expatriate sportspeople in Spain
Senegalese expatriate sportspeople in Italy
Senegalese expatriate sportspeople in England
Expatriate footballers in Spain
Expatriate footballers in Italy
Expatriate footballers in Belgium
Expatriate footballers in England
Doping cases in association football